Spain participated in the Eurovision Song Contest 2014 with the song "Dancing in the Rain" written by Ruth Lorenzo, Jim Irvin and Julian Emery. The song was performed by Ruth Lorenzo. The Spanish broadcaster Televisión Española (TVE) organised the national final Mira quién va a Eurovisión in order to select the Spanish entry for the 2014 contest in Copenhagen, Denmark. Five artists and songs competed in the televised show where an in-studio jury and a public televote selected "Dancing in the Rain" performed by Ruth Lorenzo as the winner.

As a member of the "Big Five", Spain automatically qualified to compete in the final of the Eurovision Song Contest. Performing in position 19, Spain placed tenth out of the 26 participating countries with 74 points.

Background 

The nation has won the contest on two occasions: in 1968 with the song "La, la, la" performed by Massiel and in 1969 with the song "Vivo cantando" performed by Salomé, the latter having won in a four-way tie with France, the Netherlands and the United Kingdom. Spain has also finished second four times, with Karina in 1971, Mocedades in 1973, Betty Missiego in 1979 and Anabel Conde in 1995. In 2013, Spain placed twenty-first with the song "Contigo hasta el final" performed by ESDM.

The Spanish national broadcaster, Televisión Española (TVE), broadcasts the event within Spain and organises the selection process for the nation's entry. TVE confirmed their intentions to participate at the 2014 Eurovision Song Contest on 25 September 2013. In 2012 and 2013, TVE selected the artist that would compete at the Eurovision Song Contest via an internal selection, while the song was selected via a national final. For their 2014 entry, the broadcaster announced on 20 January 2014 that it would organise a national final which would feature a competition among several artists and songs.

Before Eurovision

Mira quién va a Eurovisión 
Mira quién va a Eurovisión was the national final organised by TVE that took place on 22 February 2014 at the TVE Studios in Sant Cugat del Vallès, Barcelona, hosted by Anne Igartiburu. The show was broadcast on La 1, TVE Internacional as well as online via TVE's official website rtve.es and the official Eurovision Song Contest website eurovision.tv. Five artists and songs competed with the winner being decided upon through a combination of public televoting and an in-studio expert jury. The national final was watched by 1.722 million viewers in Spain with a market share of 9.8%.

Competing entries 
The five competing acts were announced on 20 January 2014 during a press conference held at the TVE Sala de Comunicación Torrespaña Headquarters in Madrid, hosted by Anne Irgartiburu. Demo versions of the competing songs were previewed by TVE on their official website on 3 February 2014, while the songs in their entirety were premiered a day later on 17 February also on TVE's official website.

Final 
The televised final took place on 22 February 2014. The running order for the five participating entries was determined during a press conference held at the TVE Torrespaña Headquarters in Madrid on 18 February 2014. The winner, "Dancing in the Rain" performed by Ruth Lorenzo, was selected through the combination of the votes of an in-studio jury (50%) and a public televote (50%). Brequette and Ruth Lorenzo were tied at 66 points each but since Ruth Lorenzo received the most votes from the public she was declared the winner.

The three members of the in-studio jury that evaluated the entries during the final were:

 David Bustamante – Singer-songwriter
 Merche – Singer-songwriter
 Mónica Naranjo – Singer-songwriter, music producer

In addition to the performances of the competing entries, the guest performer was former Eurovision contestant Gisela which represented Andorra in 2008.

Preparation 
The official video of the song, directed by Paloma Zapata, was filmed in March 2014 at the Fabra i Coats factory in Barcelona which featured an appearance by dancer Giuseppe Di Bella. The video premiered on 14 March 2013 on RTVE's website. The music video served as the official preview video for the Spanish entry.

Promotion
Ruth Lorenzo made several appearances across Europe to specifically promote "Dancing in the Rain" as the Spanish Eurovision entry. On 5 April, Ruth Lorenzo performed "Dancing in the Rain" during the Eurovision in Concert event which was held at the Melkweg venue in Amsterdam, Netherlands and hosted by Cornald Maas and Sandra Reemer. On 13 April, she performed during the London Preview Party, which was held at the Café de Paris venue in London, United Kingdom and hosted by Nicki French and Paddy O'Connell, as well as during the Birmingham Pride Ball event as the headline act. Lorenzo also took part in promotional activities in Sweden and Belgium where she appeared and performed on local television shows.

In addition to her international appearances, she performed the song on several television and radio shows, including the Todos Somos Raros, Todos Somos Únicos telethon on La 2 on 2 March. On 25 March, Lorenzo performed "Dancing in the Rain" during ¡Mira quién baila!, the Spanish version of Dancing with the Stars. On 27 March, Lorenzo swam with sharks at the Madrid Zoo Aquarium to fulfill her promise that she would fight her fear of sharks if she was selected to represent Spain at the 2014 contest.

At Eurovision

According to Eurovision rules, all nations with the exceptions of the host country and the "Big Five" (France, Germany, Italy, Spain and the United Kingdom) are required to qualify from one of two semi-finals in order to compete for the final; the top ten countries from each semi-final progress to the final. As a member of the "Big 5", Spain automatically qualified to compete in the final on 10 May 2014. In addition to their participation in the final, Spain is also required to broadcast and vote in one of the two semi-finals. During the semi-final allocation draw on 20 January 2014, Spain was assigned to broadcast and vote in the first semi-final on 6 May 2014.

In Spain, the semi-finals were broadcast on La 2 and the final was broadcast on La 1. Both shows featured commentary by José María Íñigo. The Spanish spokesperson, who announced the Spanish votes during the final, was Carolina Casado. The broadcast of the final was watched by 5.141 million viewers in Spain with a market share of 35.2%. This represented an increase of 2.1% from the previous year with 200,000 less viewers.

Final 
Ruth Lorenzo took part in technical rehearsals on 4 and 6 May, followed by dress rehearsals on 9 and 10 May. This included the jury final on 9 May where the professional juries of each country watched and voted on the competing entries. After technical rehearsals were held on 6 May, the "Big 5" countries and host nation Denmark held a press conference. As part of this press conference, the artists took part in a draw to determine which half of the grand final they would subsequently participate in. Spain was drawn to compete in the second half. Following the conclusion of the second semi-final, the shows' producers decided upon the running order of the final. The running order for the semi-finals and final was decided by the shows' producers rather than through another draw, so that similar songs were not placed next to each other. Spain was subsequently placed to perform in position 19, following the entry from Finland and before the entry from Switzerland.

The Spanish performance featured Ruth Lorenzo on stage in wet hair wearing a long mermaid cut dress designed by Danish company Karim Design. The stage was predominantly blue with the cube structure displaying moving light effects that resembled falling raindrops. The performance originally featured Lorenzo wearing a Marilyn Monroe-inspired sequined dress with black steel plates designed by designer Ana Martín from Spanish company Anmargo; however, the Spanish delegation opted to use to the dress designed by Karim Design prior to the first dress rehearsal on 9 May following social media criticism. In regards to the dress change, Lorenzo stated: "The dress in the final was wonderful. I am very grateful for their work and effort, but when we saw the effect on the screen, we had to look for alternatives." An additional four off-stage backing vocalists were also part of the performance: Mey Green, Sandra Borrego, Aiwinnie MyBaby and Alana Sinkëy. Green was a backing vocalist for Spain in 2012 and 2013, while Borrego was a backing vocalist for Spain in 2011. Spain placed tenth in the final, scoring 74 points.

Voting 
Voting during the three shows consisted of 50 percent public televoting and 50 percent from a jury deliberation. The jury consisted of five music industry professionals who were citizens of the country they represent, with their names published before the contest to ensure transparency. This jury was asked to judge each contestant based on: vocal capacity; the stage performance; the song's composition and originality; and the overall impression by the act. In addition, no member of a national jury could be related in any way to any of the competing acts in such a way that they cannot vote impartially and independently. The individual rankings of each jury member were released shortly after the grand final.

Following the release of the full split voting by the EBU after the conclusion of the competition, it was revealed that Spain had placed fifteenth with the public televote and eleventh with the jury vote. In the public vote, Spain scored 41 points and in the jury vote the nation scored 83 points.

Below is a breakdown of points awarded to Spain and awarded by Spain in the first semi-final and grand final of the contest, and the breakdown of the jury voting and televoting conducted during the two shows:

Points awarded to Spain

Points awarded by Spain

Detailed voting results
The following members comprised the Spanish jury:
 Raúl Fuentes Cuenca (Raúl; jury chairperson)artist
  (La Dama)artist
 Jorge Gonzálezsinger
 Leticia Fuentescomposer, singer
 Francisco Rodríguez (Kiko Rodríguez)songwriter, singer, music producer

References

2014
Countries in the Eurovision Song Contest 2014
Eurovision
Eurovision
Articles containing video clips